Azim Gök (born 25 January 1996 in Gonbad-e Kavus) is an Iranian football centre back, who currently plays for Malavan.

Club career

Esteghlal
He made his debut for Esteghlal in 18th fixtures of 2016–17 Persian Gulf Pro League against Sanat Naft Abadan while he substituted in for Ali Ghorbani.

References

External links

Living people
1996 births
Iranian footballers
Esteghlal F.C. players
Malavan players
People from Gonbad-e Qabus
Association football defenders
Sanat Mes Kerman F.C. players